Aspitates ochrearia, the yellow belle, is a moth in the family Geometridae. The species was first described by Pietro Rossi in 1794. It is found in western and southern Europe, as well as North America.

The wingspan is 25–34 mm. Adults are on wing from April to June and again from August to September in two generations per year.

The larvae feed on various herbaceous plants, including  Daucus carota and  Plantago coronopus. The larvae can be found from April to June. The species overwinters in the larval stage. Pupation takes place in spring.

Similar species
Aspitates gilvaria

References

External links

Lepiforum e.V.

Moths described in 1794
Aspitatini
Moths of Europe
Moths of North America
Moths of Asia
Taxa named by Pietro Rossi